In physical geography, a steppe is an ecoregion characterized by grassland plains without trees except near rivers and lakes.
Steppe biomes may include:

 the montane grasslands and shrublands biome
 the temperate grasslands, savannas and shrublands biome 

A steppe may be  semi-arid or covered with grass or with shrubs or with both, depending on the season and latitude. The term "steppe climate" denotes the climate encountered in regions too dry to support a forest but not dry enough to be a desert. Steppe soils are typically of the chernozem type.

Steppes are usually characterized by a semi-arid or continental climate. Besides this major seasonal difference, fluctuations between day and night are also very great. In both the highlands of Mongolia and northern Nevada,  can be reached during the day with sub-freezing readings at night.

Mid-latitude steppes feature hot summers and cold winters, averaging  of  precipitation per year. Precipitation level alone does not define a steppe climate; potential evapotranspiration also plays a role.

Classification 

Steppe can be classified by climate: 
 Temperate steppe: the "true" steppe, found in continental areas of the world; they can be further subdivided, as in the Rocky Mountains Steppes
 Subtropical steppe: a similar association of plants occurring in the driest areas with a Mediterranean-like climate; it usually has a short wet period

It can also be classified by vegetation type, e.g. shrub-steppe and alpine-steppe.

The  Eurasian Grass-Steppe, with its temperate grasslands, savannas, and shrublands, is speculated to have had a role in the spread of the horse, the wheel, and the Indo-European languages.

Locations

Cold steppe

The world's largest steppe region, often referred to as "the Great Steppe", is found in Eastern Europe and Central Asia, and neighbouring countries stretching from Ukraine in the west through Russia, Kazakhstan, Turkmenistan and Uzbekistan to the Altai, Koppet Dag and Tian Shan ranges in China.

The inner parts of Anatolia in Turkey, Central Anatolia and East Anatolia in particular and also some parts of Southeast Anatolia, as well as much of Armenia and Iran are largely dominated by cold steppe.

The Pannonian Plain is another steppe region in Central Europe, centered in Hungary but also including portions of Slovakia, Poland, Ukraine, Romania, Serbia, Croatia, Slovenia, and Austria.

Another large steppe area (prairie) is located in the central United States, western Canada and the northern part of Mexico. The shortgrass prairie steppe is the westernmost part of the Great Plains region. The Columbia Plateau in southern British Columbia, Oregon, Idaho, and Washington state, is an example of a steppe region in North America outside of the Great Plains.

In South America, cold steppe can be found in Patagonia and much of the high elevation regions east of the southern Andes.

Relatively small steppe areas can be found in the interior of the South Island of New Zealand.

In Australia, a moderately sized temperate steppe region exists in the northern and northwest regions of Victoria, extending to the southern and mid regions of New South Wales. This area borders the semi-arid and arid Australian Outback which is found farther inland on the continent.

Subtropical steppe
In Europe, some Mediterranean areas have a steppe-like vegetation, such as central Sicily in Italy, southern Portugal, parts of Greece in the southern Athens area, and central-eastern Spain, especially the southeastern coast (around Murcia), and places cut off from adequate moisture due to rain shadow effects such as Zaragoza.

In Asia, a subtropical steppe can be found in semi-arid lands that fringe the Thar Desert of the Indian subcontinent as well as much of the Deccan Plateau  in the rain shadow of the Western Ghats, and the Badia of the Levant.

In Australia, subtropical steppe can be found in a belt surrounding the most severe deserts of the continent and around the Musgrave Ranges.

In North America this environment is typical of transition areas between zones with a Mediterranean climate and true deserts, such as Reno, Nevada, the inner part of California, and much of western Texas and adjacent areas in Mexico.

See also

 Baraba steppe
Canadian Prairies
Coastal plain
California coastal prairie
Western Gulf coastal grasslands
Desert
Eurasian Steppe
Field (agriculture)
Flooded grasslands and savannas
Flood-meadow
Forest steppe
Grassland
Great Hungarian Plain
High Plains
Kazakh Steppe
Mammoth steppe
Meadow
Mongolian-Manchurian grassland
Pasture
Plain
Pontic–Caspian steppe
Pannonian Steppe#Pannonian steppe in Hungary – Puszta
Rangeland
Savanna
Steppe Route
Syrian Steppe
Temperate grasslands, savannas, and shrublands
Tugay – type of river forests related with steppes
Tundra
Water-meadow
Wet meadow
Veld

References

Sources
Ecology and Conservation of Steppe-land Birds by Manuel B.Morales, Santi Mañosa, Jordi Camprodón, Gerard Bota. International Symposium on Ecology and Conservation of steppe-land birds. Lleida, Spain. December 2004.

External links

 

Grasslands
Montane grasslands and shrublands
Temperate grasslands, savannas, and shrublands
Ecoregions
Plains
Prairies